Hiromichi (written: 煕通, 博通, 宏典, 弘道, 広道, 浩道, 寛道, 寛理 or 博達) is a masculine Japanese given name. Notable people with the name include:

, Japanese wrestler
, Japanese scholar, philosopher, writer and poet
, Japanese baseball player
, Japanese volleyball player
, Japanese footballer
, Japanese scientist
, Japanese entomologist and anthropologist
, Japanese businessman
, Japanese motorcycle racer
, Japanese financial executive
, Japanese animation producer
, Japanese linguist
, Japanese World War II flying ace
, Japanese noble
, Japanese voice actor  
, Japanese video game designer, director and producer
, Japanese politician
, Japanese Imperial Army officer

Surname
, Japanese Paralympic athlete

Japanese-language surnames
Japanese masculine given names